2016–17 Hong Kong Premier League (also known as BOC Life Hong Kong Premier League for sponsorship reasons) was the third season of Hong Kong Premier League, the top division of Hong Kong football. The season was won by Kitchee. Kitchee forward Sandro was the top goalscorer with 21 goals. South China and HKFC were relegated to the Hong Kong First Division.

Teams 
A total of 11 teams will contest the league, including seven sides from the 2015–16 Hong Kong Premier League, two promoted from the 2015–16 Hong Kong First Division League and two new teams.

Stadia and locations 

Primary venues used in the Hong Kong Premier League:

Remarks:
1The capacity of Aberdeen Sports Ground reduces from 9,000 to 4,000 as only the main stand is opened for football matches.

Personnel and Kits

Managerial Changes

Foreign Players 
The number of foreign players is restricted to six (including an Asian player) per team, with no more than four on pitch during matches. Non-Chinese/Hong Kong player could not be registered in R&F as one of the participating conditions of the China-based club. Moreover, R&F need to have at least eight Hong Kong players in the squad.

League table

Positions by Round

Results

Season statistics

Scoring

Top Scorer

Hat-tricks

 4 Player scored 4 goals

Attendances

Hong Kong Top Footballer Awards

References 

Hong Kong Premier League seasons
Hong Kong
2016–17 in Hong Kong football